Following is a list of pet magazines.

Pets
  PetTalk Magazine

Dogs
The Pet Gazette Magazine
Front & Finish, The Dog Trainer's News
Dog Fancy
Dog World
Bully Bizz Magazine
FIDO Friendly
Modern Dog (magazine)

Cats
Cat Fancy
Modern Cat

Fish
Aquarium Fish International
Aquarium Fish Magazine
Tropical Fish Hobbyist

Ferrets
Ferrets Magazine

Animal and pet magazines